The Herzliya Hebrew Gymnasium (HaGymnasia HaIvrit Herzliya, Also known as Gymnasia Herzliya), originally known as HaGymnasia HaIvrit (lit. Hebrew High School) is a historic high school in Tel Aviv, Israel.

History

The original building

Gymnasia Herzliya was the country's first Hebrew high school, founded in 1905 in Jaffa, part of the Ottoman Empire in those days. The cornerstone-laying for the school's new building on Herzl Street in the Ahuzat Bayit neighborhood (the nucleus of future Tel Aviv) took place on July 28, 1909. The building was designed by Joseph Barsky, inspired by descriptions of Solomon's Temple.

The building on Herzl Street was a major Tel Aviv landmark until 1962, when the site was razed for the construction of Shalom Meir Tower. The new tower was the tallest building in Israel those days, representing a significant architectural achievement.

The destruction of the Hebrew High School building sparked widespread recognition of the importance of conserving historical landmarks. The Council for Conservation of Heritage Sites in Israel was founded in the 1980s partly in response to the fate of Herzliya Hebrew High School.

The current building
Located today on Jabotinsky Street, it serves as a six-year secondary school. The modern campus is entered through a gate that is reminiscent of the facade of the 1909 building.

Principals

Former principals include Haim Bograshov, Baruch Ben Yehuda and Carmi Yogev. In 1992, former Air Force fighter pilot and Brigadier General Ron Huldai was appointed principal. He implemented many changes and modernizations later adopted by other schools.  After leaving the school, he was elected mayor of Tel Aviv. The current principal is Ze'ev Dgannie.

Notable faculty
 Yosef Haim Brenner, writer
 Zvi Nishri, physical education pioneer
 Shaul Tchernichovsky, poet

Notable alumni 

 Netiva Ben-Yehuda (1928–2011), Palmach commander, Hebrew scholar, and author
 Miriam Bernstein-Cohen (1895–1991), actress
 Aron Brand, pediatric cardiologist
 Yitzhak Danziger (1916–1977), sculptor
 Kosso Eloul (1920–1995), sculptor
 Nachum Gutman, (1898–1980), painter, sculptor, and author
 Ron Huldai, mayor of Tel Aviv since 1998 (as of June 2022)
 Yaron London, (1940–), media personality, journalist, actor, and songwriter
 Moshe Many, urologist; President of Tel Aviv University, and President of Ashkelon Academic College.
 Aharon Megged, (1920–2016), writer
 Moshe Menuhin, (1893–1983), author
 Yuval Neeman, (1925–2006), physicist
 Elyakum Ostashinski, first mayor of Rishon LeZion
 Moshe Sharett (1894–1965), second Prime Minister of Israel (1954–55)
 Avraham Shlonsky (1900–73), poet
 Giora Spiegel (born 1947), soccer player and coach
 Avigdor Stematsky (1908–89), painter
 Yemima Tchernovitz-Avidar (1909–98), author
 Yair Lapid, (1963–) former Israeli Prime Minister, journalist, author, and politician; former Israeli Minister of Finance and chairman of the Yesh Atid Party
 Amos Luzzatto, (1928–), physicist
 Shemuel Yeivin (1896–1982), archaeologist

References

External links

School website (in Hebrew)

High schools in Israel
Educational institutions established in 1905
Buildings designed to replicate Solomon's Temple
1905 establishments in the Ottoman Empire
Jews and Judaism in Tel Aviv
Schools in Tel Aviv